Szlak Batorego (Trail of Báthory) is a manmade waterway in Poland first developed during the reign of Stephen Báthory in the 1600s.  It connects the Zegrze Reservoir, the Narew, the Biebrza, the Augustów Canal, and the Neman River.

Canals in Poland